Black Mark Production (founded 1991) is an independent record label originally based in Berlin, later on with offices in Stockholm, Toronto and New York City etc.

Black Mark Production today is a worldwide operating business placed in Villa Hammerheart, Bruzaholm, Sweden, that specializes in extreme metal releases. It is perhaps best known for its close connection to Quorthon, leader of the defining black metal band Bathory until his death in 2004.

History
As Quorthon himself has stated several times, it was often speculated that he had something to do with the business and operation of Black Mark Production, except for the concept and name of the label, which would be referenced in the title of the 1987 release Under the Sign of the Black Mark. Quorthon received permission from the Tyfon Grammofon label (which was owned by Quorthon's father, Börje "Boss" Forsberg, and featured Bathory) to use his own proxy-label on all Bathory albums, along with a unique 666-X serial number, starting with the self-titled debut album from 1984, but the label was not founded as a separate entity before 1991. Who did found it remains disputed, but many point to Boss Forsberg.

Roster
 8 Foot Sativa
 Agressor
Bathory
 Cemetary
 Dan Swanö
 Edge of Sanity
 Fleshcrawl
 Invocator
 Lake of Tears
 Memento Mori
 Morgana Lefay
 Necrophobic
 Nightingale
 Overload
 Quorthon
 Seance
 Stone

See also 
 List of record labels

References

External links 
 Official site 

Black metal record labels
Death metal record labels
Heavy metal record labels
Swedish independent record labels
Thrash metal record labels